"The DArkest Knight" is tenth episode of the seventh season of the American mystery–thriller television series Pretty Little Liars. The installment was directed by Arlene Sanford and written by showrunner I. Marlene King and executive producer Maya Goldsmith. It premiered on August 30, 2016, on the cable network Freeform.

Plot 
Spencer calls 911 to report Hanna's abduction. At the same time, Hanna uses a knife to get some of Noel's blood to send to a DNA lab. Aria, Alison, Emily, Mona, Caleb and Spencer team up with the Rosewood P.D. to find Hanna. Detective Furey leads the investigation and promises to Spencer to find both Hanna and Noel, as Spencer kisses him on the cheek, resulting in an awkward-yet-great situation. Mona and Caleb investigate Jenna, and discover she doesn't know where either Hanna nor Noel are. Mona receives a call from Hanna and secretly leaves to assist her friend. Mona convinces Hanna to return home. Afterwards, Hanna and Caleb argue about her actions and the two end up having sex. Alison reveals to Emily that she's pregnant with Archer's baby, and they kiss. Mona threatens Jenna, stating she should get out of Rosewood. Aria looks forward to Ezra, but a newscast reveals that Nicole was found alive and, through the television, Aria sees Ezra and Nicole kissing.

The next morning, Spencer visits Toby to say goodbye, and the two end up kissing. Paige accuses Emily of being Alison's "puppet," though she did not know about the hookup or the pregnancy. Hanna is shocked when she discovers that Noel is not Mary Drake's second child, and reveals to her friends what she really had been up to. The Liars manage to distract the guards and drive to where Hanna kept Noel hostage only to find that he escaped. They find a text with an address and a 10 p.m. meeting time, stating they would swap the USB for the camera with which Hanna filmed herself torturing Noel earlier. At the same time, Mona and Caleb stalk Jenna, but end up finding out that Sydney was disguised as Jenna. The Liars arrive at the address of the text, which lead the Liars into an abandoned school for the blind where Jenna, armed with a gun, attempts to murder the Liars with Noel. However, Noel, while attacking Hanna and Emily, trips on his axe and accidentally kills himself via decapitation. Jenna then shoots at the Liars, as they run, but get separated from Spencer, who is shot. Before Jenna could cause more damage, she is taken down by Mary Drake and pulled away by "A.D." unseen.

Mary then reveals that she is Spencer's biological mother. Meanwhile, scenes reveal that, while leaving town, Toby's car crashed into a tree, leaving Yvonne's and his fate unknown. At the end, "A.D." places Jenna in their van and gives her her glasses back. She questions who they are and if they shot Spencer. "A.D." gives Jenna their mask, which she feels. She realizes she is with "A.D.", as "A.D." adjusts their hoodie and prepares to drive.

Cast 

Following is the list of billed cast.

Main cast 
 Troian Bellisario as Spencer Hastings
 Ashley Benson as Hanna Marin
 Tyler Blackburn as Caleb Rivers, Spencer and Hanna's love interest
 Lucy Hale as Aria Montgomery
 Ian Harding as Ezra Fitz, Aria's fiancée
 Shay Mitchell as Emily Fields
 Andrea Parker as Mary Drake, Alison's aunt
 Janel Parrish as Mona Vanderwaal, the Liars' long-time friend
 Sasha Pieterse as Alison DiLaurentis

Recurring cast 
 Keegan Allen as Toby Cavanaugh, Spencer's ex-boyfriend and Rosewood P.D.'s officer
 Brant Daugherty as Noel Kahn, the Liars' long-time frenemy
 Lindsey Shaw as Paige McCullers, Emily's Ex-girlfriend
 Nicholas Gonzalez as Detective Marco Furey, the Rosewood P.D.'s head detective
 Rebecca Breeds as Nicole Gordon, Ezra's missing ex-girlfriend
 Kara Royster as Yvonne Phillips, Toby's wife
 Chloe Bridges as Sydney Driscoll, Jenna's friend
 Tammin Sursok as Jenna Marshall, one of the Liars' main rivals and a worker of  "A.D."

Production 
The episode was written by the series' creator and main collaborator I. Marlene King with executive producer Maya Goldsmith. The title of the episode was revealed by King through Twitter on June 18, 2016. The table-read for this episode occurred on June 23, 2016, while the episode was filmed in June 2016 in and around Los Angeles, California, mostly on the backlot of the Warner Bros. studio lot in Burbank.

Music 
The installment features songs "Waving Wild" by Arum Rae, "Paradise" by Clementine & the Galaxy, "In the Light" by the Lumineers, and "In Too Deep" by the Sweeplings. The score is composed by Michael Suby, who works on the series since the premiere.

Reception

Ratings 
The episode first aired in the United States on August 30, 2016, to a viewership of 1.33 million Americans, and garnered a 0.7 rating in the 18–49 demographic, according to Nielsen Media Research. Values from this episode had a notorious increase from the previous episode, "The Wrath of Kahn." This episode is rated TV-14. After Live +3 DVR ratings, the episode tied for the twenty-fifth spot in Adults 18-49, finishing with a 1.1 rating among adults aged 18–49, and aired to a total viewership of 2.10 million, placing in the seventeenth spot in viewership.

Reviews 
Louisa Mellor of Den of Geek commented, "I'm really looking forward to seeing what PLL looks like when it isn't holding anything back. I hope it's ridiculous, and beautiful, and subversive. Just like it's always been." Also on Season 7, she further added: "I complained that the show had lost its flavour, the things that made it different, and become a parody of itself. While I'm not quite retracting that argument, I do feel like season seven has been a marked improvement." G.A. Benitez of Cryptic Rock gave the episode a good review, calling it a "Mid-Season finale to die for." Mark Trammell of TV Equals praised the episode, stating, "While a little too much time was spend on the mid-season finale dealing with all the various ‘ships in play for my tastes, the ending confrontation more than made up for it, and if you’d told me we’d ever see the day that [the series] featured a full-on decapitation, I’d have told you that you were crazier than a roomful of Radley patients, and yet, here it was. You gotta love it."

On the other side, the episode received an unfavorable review from Paul Dailly, from TVFanatic, who labeled it as "one of the weakest finales to date." He added, "[the episode] was far from perfect. At this stage, a lot of the reveals felt cheap. We still have 10 episodes left, and we need answers before it's too late. Waiting until April is going to be a drag."

References

External links 

 

Pretty Little Liars episodes
2016 American television episodes